The sixteenth season of the American television medical drama Grey's Anatomy was ordered on May 10, 2019, by American Broadcasting Company (ABC). The season premiered on September 26, 2019. The season is produced by ABC Studios, in association with Shondaland Production Company and Entertainment One Television; the showrunner being Krista Vernoff.

The season's main storylines include the recently fired Dr. Meredith Grey (Ellen Pompeo)'s impending trial to fight for her medical license and her on-off again love-life with surgical resident, Andrew DeLuca (Giacomo Gianniotti), who begins to spiral into bipolar mania. Alex Karev (Justin Chambers) and Richard Webber (James Pickens Jr.) also begin working at Pac-North after being fired by Chief Miranda Bailey (Chandra Wilson). Other storylines include Teddy Altman (Kim Raver)'s affair with Tom Koracick (Greg Germann) in the wake of her engagement to Owen Hunt (Kevin McKidd); Amelia Shepherd (Caterina Scorsone)'s surprise pregnancy, with the baby's paternity brought into question; Jackson Avery (Jesse Williams) and Maggie Pierce (Kelly McCreary)'s break up; Miranda Bailey's miscarriage; and Jo Karev (Camilla Luddington)'s emergence from the psychiatric ward after treatment. 

This is the final season to feature Dr. Alex Karev, portrayed by Justin Chambers as a series-regular, whose announced departure was made in January 2020. His final physical appearance was the milestone 350th episode "My Shot" in November 2019. Following this, he abruptly left the series. However, Vernoff was able to bring him back for voice-over in a farewell episode, explaining where the character ended up. This episode "Leave a Light On" became the season's most-discussed and analyzed episode, with Chambers' character's departure after 16 years receiving a polarizing response from audiences. However, it drew a ratings upswing, shooting up its best ratings in 6 weeks since its mid-season premiere. It also re-visited Katherine Heigl's character, Izzie Stevens who departed mid-way through the sixth season. 

On March 12, 2020, the production of the sixteenth season was suspended due to the COVID-19 pandemic in the United States. 21 out of the original 25 episode order were completed before production was suspended. On March 27, 2020, it was announced that the twenty-first episode would serve as the season finale. The season finale, which aired on April 9, 2020, ended with 7.33 million viewers, an improvement from the previous season's 5.99 million viewership, and became the first season to not end in May in all of its 15 years.

Episodes

The number in the "No. overall" column refers to the episode's number within the overall series, whereas the number in the "No. in season" column refers to the episode's number within this particular season. "U.S. viewers in millions" refers to the number of Americans in millions who watched the episodes live. Each episode of this season is named after a song.

Cast and characters

Main 
 Ellen Pompeo as Dr. Meredith Grey
 Justin Chambers as Dr. Alex Karev
 Chandra Wilson as Dr. Miranda Bailey
 James Pickens Jr. as Dr. Richard Webber
 Kevin McKidd as Dr. Owen Hunt
 Jesse Williams as Dr. Jackson Avery
 Caterina Scorsone as Dr. Amelia Shepherd
 Camilla Luddington as Dr. Jo Karev
 Kelly McCreary as Dr. Maggie Pierce
 Giacomo Gianniotti as Dr. Andrew DeLuca
 Kim Raver as Dr. Teddy Altman
 Greg Germann as Dr. Tom Koracick
 Jake Borelli as Dr. Levi Schmitt
 Chris Carmack as Dr. Atticus "Link" Lincoln

Recurring 
 Jason George as Dr. Ben Warren
 Richard Flood as Dr. Cormac Hayes
 Debbie Allen as Dr. Catherine Fox
 Stefania Spampinato as Dr. Carina DeLuca
 Alex Blue Davis as Dr. Casey Parker
 Jaicy Elliot as Dr. Taryn Helm
 Sophia Ali as Dr. Dahlia Qadri
 Alex Landi as Dr. Nico Kim
 Jaina Lee Ortiz as Lt. Andrea "Andy" Herrera
 Cleo King as Robin
 Devika Parikh as Nancy Klein
 Barrett Doss as Victoria "Vic" Hughes
 Devin Way as Dr. Blake Simms
 Vivian Nixon as Dr. Hannah Brody
 Jasmine Guy as Gemma Larson
 Noah Alexander Gerry as Joey Phillips
 Sarah Rafferty as Suzanne
 Lindy Booth as Hadley
 Shoshannah Stern as Dr. Lauren Riley

Notable guests 
 Anthony Hill as Dr. Winston Ndugu
 Holly Marie Combs as Heidi Peterson
 Alyssa Milano as Haylee Peterson
 Hal Linden as Bertram Hollister
 Lisa Ann Walter as Shirley Gregory
 Granville Ames as Eric Lincoln
 Bess Armstrong as Maureen Lincoln
 Skyler Shaye as Katie Bryce
 Robin Pearson Rose as Patricia Murphy
 Rachel Bay Jones as Carly 
 Miguel Sandoval as Captain Pruitt Herrera
 Okieriete Onaodowan as Dean Miller
 Grey Damon as LT Jack Gibson
 Danielle Savre as Captain Maya Bishop
 James Saito as Hershel Roberts
 Denise Dowse as Lorraine Simms
 Ariela Barer as Paula
 Beanie Feldstein as Tess Anderson
 George Gerdes as Norman Sholman 
 Debra Jo Rupp as Jo's Therapist
 Jonathan Cake as Griffin Ford
 Crystal McCreary as Sabrina Webber 
 Zaiver Sinnett as Dr. Zander Perez
 Sherri Saum as Allison Brown
 Debra Mooney as Evelyn Hunt
 Amanda Payton as Dr. Daphne Lopez

Production

Casting 
On May 10, 2019, with the renewal announcement it was revealed that Chris Carmack, Greg Germann and Jake Borelli had been promoted to series-regulars. In October 2019, it was announced that Richard Flood had been cast as the new head of Pediatric Surgery at Grey Sloan, replacing Karev, who was fired in the previous season. On January 10, 2020, it was announced that Justin Chambers would be leaving the series, with his last episode being the 350th.

Ratings

References

Grey's Anatomy seasons
2019 American television seasons
2020 American television seasons
Television productions suspended due to the COVID-19 pandemic